Josué Castillejos Toledo (born 14 April 1981 in Toluca, Estado de Mexico) is a former Mexican football holding midfielder who played for Club Universidad de Guadalajara in the Liga MX.

Club career
Born in Toluca, Castillejos is a product of Deportivo Toluca F.C.'s youth system. He made his Mexican Primera División debut with Toluca in 2002.

In 2008, Castillejos left Toluca to play on loan with Chiapas, and then for Primera A side Tiburones Rojos de Veracruz. Castillejos returned to Toluca in January 2009, but would not appear again for the club in the Primera División.

References

External links

1981 births
Living people
People from Toluca
Footballers from the State of Mexico
Association football midfielders
Deportivo Toluca F.C. players
Chiapas F.C. footballers
C.D. Veracruz footballers
Atlético Mexiquense footballers
La Piedad footballers
Leones Negros UdeG footballers
Liga MX players
Mexican footballers